Sachsen (b Ansbach) station is a railway station in the municipality of Sachsen bei Ansbach, located in the Ansbach district in Bavaria, Germany. The station is on the Nuremberg–Crailsheim line of Deutsche Bahn.

References

Railway stations in Bavaria
Buildings and structures in Ansbach (district)
Nuremberg S-Bahn stations